Nimaima is a tourist town in Colombia in the Cundinamarca Department.

Municipalities of Cundinamarca Department